Madd Koondhar(), is a village in the Naushahro Feroze District, of Sindh, Pakistan.  It is located along Khan Wahan Miner. The village is based on over 125 houses.  The population is about 500. People are civilized. The literacy rate is 100%.  Many people are highly skilled workers; a majority of these are doctors, with engineers second in the list.  The most common job overall is teacher. Sources of income include agriculture, business, and government.

Kandiaro Taluka